Volcano is the second studio album by English psychedelic rock band Temples, released on 3 March 2017 by Heavenly Records. The album was recorded at their home studio, and is self-produced.

Temples member James Bagshaw described the album as being "a result of implementing a load of things that we didn't know about the first time around [on Sun Structures]".

Singles
"Certainty" was released as a single in September 2016. This was followed by a remixes EP of the single in November 2016, featuring remixes by Franz Ferdinand and Grumbling Fur Maschine. The second single "Strange or Be Forgotten" was released on 10 January 2017. This was also followed by a remix by Jono Ma of Jagwar Ma, titled "Strange or Be Forgottten" (Jono Ma Even Stranger Version) on 16 February 2017. A third single, "Born into the Sunset", was released on 27 February 2017.

Critical reception

At Metacritic, which assigns a normalized rating out of 100 to reviews from mainstream critics, the album received an average score of 72, based on 18 reviews, which indicates "generally favorable reviews".

In a positive review, Clash said that the album was "rich in intricately layered synths, blending swathes of influences into a more distinctive sound". However, The Independent viewed Volcano in a more negative light, criticising the change in direction from their previous release, Sun Structures.

Track listing

Charts

References

2017 albums
Heavenly Recordings albums
Temples (band) albums